Aksa is a Turkish company manufacturing carbon fiber, natural white and solution dyed acrylic staple fiber, tow and tops for yarn spinning and non wovens. Established in 1968 in Yalova, Turkey, the company is the world's largest producer under one roof, with an annual production capacity of 308.000 tons.

Aksa is listed on the Istanbul Stock Exchange. Together with Dow Chemical, the DowAksa joint venture was established in 2012 to produce carbon fibers.

See also 
List of companies of Turkey

References

Manufacturing companies of Turkey
Chemical companies established in 1968
Companies listed on the Istanbul Stock Exchange
Turkish companies established in 1968